A Drunkard's Reformation is a 1909 American drama film directed by D. W. Griffith. Prints of the film survive in the film archive of the Library of Congress. The 	American Mutoscope and Biograph Company advertised the feature as "The most powerful temperance lecture ever depicted".

Plot
In its March 27, 1909 issue, the New York-based trade journal The Moving Picture World provides the following description of the film's plot:

Cast

 Arthur V. Johnson as John Wharton
 Linda Arvidson as Mrs. John Wharton
 Adele DeGarde as The Wharton Daughter
 Charles Avery as In the Play
 John R. Cumpson as In the Orchestra / In the Bar
 Robert Harron as Theatre Usher
 Anita Hendrie as In the Play / In the Audience
 Florence Lawrence as In the Play
 Marion Leonard as In the Play
 David Miles (actor) as In the Play
 Owen Moore as In the Play
 Tom Moore as In the Audience
 Herbert Prior as In the Bar
 Mack Sennett as In the Play / In the Orchestra / In the Bar
 Harry Solter as In the Play
 Herbert Yost as In the Play

Production
The drama was filmed in four daysFebruary 25–27 and March 1, 1909in New York City at Biograph’s studio, which was located in a converted brownstone mansion in Manhattan at 11 East 14th.

Background
A moving picture house manager in Moline, Illinois, George Dehl, promised to donate $500 to a local hospital if he could not produce films that have the best sermons beat. Dehl proposed "that they bring the Reverend Billy Sunday to Moline and have him preach the best sermon in the list, and they bring a great temperance lecturer here and instruct him to make his best effort". Dehl said once they had left, he would put on two reels of film at his theater, and if the public does not vote one of them a greater temperance sermon than what the speaker had delivered, and the other a greater religious appeal than the sermon by Sunday, he would donate the money to a local hospital. The films he had referred for showing were The Drunkard's Reformation and The Resurrection.

Variety reported that Biograph had received a letter from an exhibitor in an Iowa town, stating that when the film was shown there, it had caused the town to "go dry" at the election which occurred the week after it had been featured. The letter went on to say that the exhibitor had been visited by a delegation of "The Wets", asking for the picture not to be shown. The man refused and the town "went prohibition by a big majority".

See also
 List of American films of 1909
 D. W. Griffith filmography

References

External links

1909 films
1909 drama films
1909 short films
Silent American drama films
American silent short films
American black-and-white films
Biograph Company films
Articles containing video clips
Films directed by D. W. Griffith
1900s English-language films
1900s American films